This is a complete list of brigadier generals in the United States Regular Army before February 2, 1901. The grade of brigadier general (or one-star general) is ordinarily the fourth-highest in the peacetime Army, ranking above colonel and below major general (two-star general).

The grade of brigadier general was the highest peacetime rank in the Regular Army during the late eighteenth and early nineteenth centuries, and the second-highest for most of the nineteenth and early twentieth centuries. It was also rare: until 1901 there were fewer than twenty brigadier generals on active duty at any given time. Even during times of war, the number of Regular Army brigadier generals remained relatively constant, because rather than expand the permanent military establishment to meet transient wartime requirements, the Regular Army served as a cadre for a much larger temporary force of volunteers and conscripts. Many famous generals of the American Civil War held high rank only in the volunteer service, and reverted to much lower permanent grades in the Regular Army when the volunteers were disbanded after the war.

The number of Regular Army brigadier generals increased dramatically when the Army was reorganized after the Spanish–American War. In addition to increasing the number of brigadier generals of the line from six to fifteen, the Army instituted a practice of funneling a succession of senior colonels through each vacancy in the grade of brigadier general, each officer in turn being promoted and retired at the higher rank and retired pay after only one day in grade. The reorganization took effect on February 2, 1901.

Taxonomy
Historically, the United States Army included two components: the permanently established Regular Army, which constituted the peacetime force; and, during time of war, a much larger non-permanent establishment comprising various volunteer, conscript, and federalized state forces.

There were two types of brigadier generals in the Regular Army:
 A brigadier general of the line was an officer who was commissioned in the permanent grade of brigadier general and therefore maintained that personal rank regardless of assignment.
 A brigadier general of the staff was an officer who held the ex officio rank of brigadier general only while occupying an office designated by statute to carry that rank.

Brigadier generals in the non-permanent or non-federal establishments included the following:
 A brigadier general of militia was appointed or elected to that rank in one of the state militia forces.
 A brigadier general of levies was appointed to that rank in the federal volunteer forces raised during the Northwest Indian War.
 A brigadier general of volunteers was appointed to that rank in the United States Volunteers during the War of 1812, the Mexican War, the Civil War, or the Spanish–American War.
 A brigadier general of state volunteers was appointed to that rank in one of the non-federal volunteer forces raised by individual states during the War of 1812, the Mexican War, the Civil War, or the Spanish–American War.
 A brigadier general in the Provisional Army was appointed to that rank in the non-permanent Regular Army augmentation force called the Provisional Army of the United States authorized during the Quasi-War by the Act of May 28, 1798.
 A brigadier general in the Eventual Army was appointed to that rank in the non-permanent Regular Army augmentation force called the Eventual Army of the United States  authorized during the Quasi-War by the Act of March 2, 1799.

Brigadier generals in other establishments included the following:
 A brigadier general in the Continental Army was appointed to that rank in the United States Army's predecessor organization during the American Revolution.
 A brigadier general in the Army of the Confederate States of America was the Confederate States Army equivalent of a Regular Army brigadier general during the Civil War.
 A brigadier general in the Provisional Army of the Confederate States was the Confederate States Army equivalent of a brigadier general of volunteers during the Civil War.

In addition, honorary brevet ranks of brigadier general were conferred in several organizations:
 A brevet brigadier general was awarded that brevet rank in the Regular Army, typically for actions in the War of 1812, the Mexican War, or the Civil War.
 A brevet brigadier general of volunteers was awarded that brevet rank in the United States Volunteers, typically for actions in the Civil War or the Spanish–American War.
 A brevet brigadier general of militia was awarded that brevet rank in one of the state militia forces.

List of brigadier generals before February 2, 1901
The following list of brigadier generals includes all officers appointed to that rank in the line or staff of the United States Regular Army prior to February 2, 1901. It does not include officers who held that rank solely by brevet or in the non-permanent or non-federal establishments, such as brigadier generals of militia or volunteers.

Entries are indexed by the numerical order in which each officer was appointed to that rank while on active duty, or by an asterisk (*) if the officer did not serve in that rank while on active duty. Each entry lists the officer's name; date of rank; date the officer vacated the active-duty rank; number of years on active duty as brigadier general (Yrs); and other biographical notes.

Timeline

Line
By February 1, 1901, there were six brigadier generals of the line (brig.gen. 1–6). An officer held the permanent grade of brigadier general (Brig.gen.) until his death; retirement; resignation; discharge; dismissal; or promotion to a higher permanent grade such as major general (Maj.gen.), lieutenant general (Lt.gen.), or general (Gen.). An officer's Regular Army grade was not affected by brevet appointments (bvt.) or appointments in other organizations such as the United States Volunteers (vols.) or the Confederate States Army (CSA).

Staff
By February 1, 1901, there were ten brigadier generals of the staff: the Quartermaster General (Q.m.Gen.), the Inspector General (Insp. Gen.), the Chief of Ordnance (C.of Ord.), the Surgeon General (Surg.Gen.), the Commissary General of Subsistence (C.G.of S.), the Chief of Engineers (C.of Eng.), the Judge Advocate General (J.A.G.), the  Paymaster General (P.m.Gen.), the Chief Signal Officer (C.S.O.), and the Chief of the Records and Pension Office (C.of R.P.O.). In addition, the office of Adjutant General (Adj. Gen.) was scheduled to revert to brigadier general rank after the term of its then-incumbent.

History

Northwest Indian War

For the first two years of its existence, the United States Army was so small that its highest-ranking officer was a lieutenant colonel, Josiah Harmar, who, as the Army's senior officer, held the rank of brigadier general only by brevet. The substantive grades of major general and brigadier general were created in 1791 when the Army was expanded to fight the Northwest Indian War; a major general was immediately appointed to supersede Harmar, in whom confidence had been lost following his defeat the year before, but the brigadier general grade remained vacant until Harmar resigned in early 1792, whereupon the Army's only other lieutenant colonel, James Wilkinson, became its first substantive brigadier general.
 
In response to its early setbacks the Army was reorganized as the Legion of the United States, merging its separate infantry, cavalry, and artillery regiments into four combined-arms sub-legions. To entice former Continental Army generals to command the sub-legions, Congress authorized four additional brigadier generalcies, but so many candidates declined these appointments that the sub-legions had to be commanded by lieutenant colonels instead. The additional brigadier generalcies expired along with the grade of major general when the Army reconstituted its regiments after the war, leaving Wilkinson as the Army's senior officer and sole brigadier general.

Quasi-War
In July 1798 the Quasi-War with France induced Congress to augment the Regular Army by raising a Provisional Army for the duration of the conflict. In addition to the general officers commissioned in the Provisional Army, the Regular Army was authorized three more brigadier generals of the line and an Adjutant General with the ex officio rank of brigadier general. John Brooks, William Washington, and Jonathan Dayton were appointed brigadier generals of the line and William North was appointed Adjutant General, but only Washington and North accepted their commissions. Both were discharged when Congress disbanded the Provisional Army in June 1800, again leaving Wilkinson as the only brigadier general.

War of 1812

Tensions arising from the Chesapeake–Leopard affair led Congress to triple the authorized strength of the Army in 1808, for a total of three brigadier generals: Wilkinson, Wade Hampton, and Peter Gansevoort. Four years later, with the War of 1812 looming, Congress authorized a massive expansion of the military establishment, led by two major generals; five more brigadier generals of the line; and an adjutant general, an inspector general, and a quartermaster general with ex officio ranks of brigadier general. Dubbed "cabinet generals," the initial cohort of general officers were selected based on mostly political criteria, and their disastrous performance early in the war led them to be phased out in favor of proven "fighting generals" like Andrew Jackson, Jacob J. Brown, and Winfield Scott.

After the war the Army reverted to a much smaller peacetime establishment. Of the fifteen brigadier generals in the Army at the beginning of 1815, only five were retained in grade: Alexander Macomb, Edmund P. Gaines, Winfield Scott, Eleazar W. Ripley, and Adjutant and Inspector General Daniel Parker. The remaining ten either resigned, were discharged as surplus in grade, or were retained in the Army at the grade of colonel. In 1821 another round of Army cuts reduced Macomb, Parker, and Henry T. Atkinson to colonel, leaving Gaines, Scott, and Quartermaster General Thomas S. Jesup as the Army's only brigadier generals. Gaines, Scott, and Jesup would monopolize the rank for a generation, spending a combined total of 104 years as brigadier generals. Jesup, appointed Quartermaster General at the age of 30, would serve a record 42 years as brigadier general, finally dying in office on the eve of the Civil War. Scott was promoted to major general in 1841 and was succeeded by Inspector General John E. Wool, the first promotion to brigadier general in over twenty years.

Mexican War

The Mexican War triggered a temporary increase in the number of general officers. In 1846 Congress authorized two additional brigadier generals on the condition that they be discharged immediately upon the ratification of a peace treaty; career Regular Army officers David E. Twiggs and Stephen W. Kearny were promoted to the new grades. The next year, three more wartime grades were authorized; Franklin Pierce, George Cadwalader, and Enos D. Hopping were appointed directly from civilian life. Hopping died a few months after his appointment, and the two remaining civilian generals were duly discharged at the end of the war, but Congress allowed Twiggs and Kearny to remain in grade while normal attrition reduced the number of brigadier generals to the desired peacetime total. Gaines and Kearny died within a year, leaving Wool and Twiggs as the two brigadier generals of the line authorized by statute.

In 1855 Congress increased the Army by four regiments and added a third brigadier generalcy of the line, which it intended for Illinois Senator James Shields, a former brigadier general of volunteers during the Mexican War who had just been defeated for reelection to the Senate. However, Scott, the Army's only major general, was almost seventy years old and likely to be succeeded by a brigadier general of the line. Since Wool and Twiggs were around the same age as Scott, the person appointed to the third brigadier generalcy could reasonably expect to become the next commanding general of the Army. Rather than vault the civilian Shields to potential command of the professional Army in a single bound, the administration instead promoted Colonel Persifor F. Smith, a distinguished career officer. Ironically, Wool and Twiggs both outlived Smith, who died unexpectedly in 1858 and was succeeded by Colonel William S. Harney.

In the end, none of the Army's prewar generals would retain high command in the United States Army during the Civil War. Of the five general officers in the Regular Army at the outbreak of hostilities, Scott retired almost immediately, Wool and Harney were sidelined and retired midway through the war, Twiggs was dismissed for treason after surrendering the garrison in Texas, and Quartermaster General Joseph E. Johnston resigned to join the Confederate States Army.

Civil War

During the Civil War Congress augmented the permanent Regular Army with a massive temporary force of volunteers and conscripts. The overwhelming majority of Civil War brigadier generals were appointed to that grade only in the volunteer service, so hundreds of wartime generals lost their ranks when the volunteers were disbanded after the war.

Early wartime vacancies in the Regular Army grade of brigadier general were filled on the basis of prewar experience or anticipated brilliance, and included Colonels Edwin V. Sumner and Philip S. G. Cooke, Inspector General Joseph K. F. Mansfield, and Major Robert Anderson, all senior stalwarts of the peacetime Army; plus two relative newcomers, Brevet Assistant Adjutant General Irvin McDowell and former First Lieutenant William S. Rosecrans. By mid-1862 permanent Regular Army brigadier generalcies were being dangled as rewards for particularly successful volunteer generals, many of whom had been civilians or very junior Regular officers before the war; these later appointments went to Colonels William T. Sherman and George H. Thomas; Major Winfield S. Hancock; Captains John Pope, George G. Meade, James B. McPherson, Philip H. Sheridan, and John M. Schofield; former Captain Joseph Hooker; and First Lieutenant Oliver O. Howard — all major generals of volunteers — and civilian Alfred H. Terry, a brigadier general of volunteers.

Most of the Army's wartime bureau chiefs were eventually elevated to the ex officio rank of brigadier general, including the Adjutant General, the Chief of Ordnance, the Surgeon General, the Commissary General of Subsistence, the Chief of Engineers, and the Judge Advocate General. In 1864 James B. Fry was appointed Provost Marshal General with the rank of brigadier general to administer the non-Regular volunteers and draftees; unique among ex officio general officers of this era, Fry lost his rank when his office was abolished after the volunteers were disbanded in 1866. In 1865 Congress established the office of Chief of Staff to the Lieutenant General with ex officio rank of brigadier general as a mechanism to transfer Brigadier General of Volunteers John A. Rawlins to the Regular Army so that he could continue to serve as Lieutenant General Ulysses S. Grant's principal military assistant after the war; the office terminated when Rawlins became President Grant's first Secretary of War in 1869.

The postwar demobilization of the volunteers reduced most Civil War officers to much lower permanent grades in the Regular Army or to civilian life, so in 1866 Congress tripled the size of the Regular Army to create enough new force structure to reward officers with the grades their wartime service merited. To recognize the many outstanding volunteer officers who had not been professional soldiers before the war, half of the new commissions were reserved for civilian volunteers and the other half for prewar professionals. As a result, many civilian volunteers gained seniority over long-serving Regulars with similar or better records. For example, by 1886 Wesley Merritt stood only eleventh on the list of colonels of the line despite having outranked during the war all ten colonels now senior to him; Merritt was appointed only a lieutenant colonel in 1866, while civilians like Thomas H. Ruger and Orlando B. Willcox were appointed to colonelcies for which Merritt, a Regular officer, was ineligible, and twenty years later Ruger and Willcox were both promoted to brigadier general ahead of him.

Postwar

Promotions in the Regular Army ground almost to a halt in the years following the Civil War, largely due to the glut of Civil War heroes who were rewarded with senior grades at a relatively young age and then camped in those grades for decades; dramatic reductions in the size of the peacetime military establishment squeezed the promotion bottleneck even tighter. Congress cut the number of brigadier generals of the line to eight in 1869 and to six a year later; death, retirement, and murder eventually cleared the path for Lieutenant Colonel George Crook to become a brigadier general of the line in 1873, the only such promotion between 1869 and 1880. Promotions did not resume their normal flow until Congress instituted a mandatory retirement age of sixty-four in 1882.

Famous field grade officers campaigned openly for every vacancy in the grade of brigadier general. The Civil War "boy generals" — Colonels Nelson A. Miles and Ranald S. Mackenzie and Lieutenant Colonel George A. Custer — became particularly notorious for their ruthless maneuvers to regain their wartime ranks. Custer was killed in 1876 making his eponymous last stand at the Little Bighorn and Mackenzie was promoted to brigadier general in 1882 but pronounced hopelessly insane two years later and involuntarily retired, but Miles — promoted to brigadier general in 1880 when President Rutherford B. Hayes agreed to accelerate Army promotions by involuntarily retiring Brigadier General Edward O. C. Ord — ascended to command of the entire Army and retired as a lieutenant general.

Political patronage weighed heavily in general officer appointments during this period. In January 1892 Secretary of War Stephen B. Elkins wanted to promote Colonel Eugene A. Carr to a vacant brigadier generalcy, but Elkins' influential predecessor, Vermont Senator Redfield Proctor, lobbied vigorously for Colonel Elwell S. Otis, while Commanding General of the Army John A. Schofield backed Colonel William P. Carlin, Senate Military Affairs Committee Chairman Joseph R. Hawley backed Colonel James W. Forsyth, and President pro tempore of the Senate Charles F. Manderson backed Colonel Frank Wheaton, who ultimately received the appointment in April. When the next vacancy opened in June, Elkins, Proctor, and Schofield agreed that Carr would be promoted but request to retire early so that Carlin could also be promoted and retired in time for Otis to be promoted before the end of President Benjamin Harrison's administration; since Carr had only two years until statutory retirement but Otis had more than a decade, this sequence would prevent the grade from falling vacant during the next four-year presidential term, thereby denying Harrison's successor an opportunity to reward a supporter. However, once promoted, Carr angrily repudiated this arrangement, claiming no one had told him he would have to retire early, so Harrison retired him involuntarily and nominated Otis for immediate promotion, skipping Carlin entirely. Carlin was promoted anyway when Otis agreed to defer his promotion at the behest of the next President, Grover Cleveland, who remembered Carlin fondly from a brief period of shared service early in the Civil War.

Spanish–American War

Congress raised a new force of volunteers to fight the Spanish–American War in 1898, and mustered a second volunteer force a year later for the Philippine–American War. In contrast to previous wars, no additional general officers were authorized in the Regular Army, confining the expansion of the general officer corps entirely to the non-permanent volunteer service. Echoing Civil War practice, volunteer generals were drawn from both Regular officers and civilians, with particularly prominent volunteer generals being rewarded with permanent brigadier generalcies in the Regular Army, including former Confederate major general Joseph Wheeler.

Many of the Army's wartime supply problems were blamed on the unusually rapid turnover of bureau chiefs before and during the war — four Quartermasters General and six Commissaries General of Subsistence in the 30 months before the war — due to a peacetime personnel policy that promoted general officers based on past service rather than future merit. In February 1882 President Chester A. Arthur involuntarily retired sixty-five-year-old Quartermaster General Montgomery C. Meigs in order to give seventy-year-old Assistant Quartermaster General Daniel H. Rucker the chance to be Quartermaster General himself before he died. Rucker served as Quartermaster General for only ten days before being retired at his own request, inaugurating a decades-long tradition of briefly elevating elderly staff officers to the top of their bureau as a reward for long service.

The use of brigadier generalcies as retirement gifts spread to the line in 1886 when Colonel Joseph H. Potter was promoted to brigadier general only six months before his statutory retirement date, signaling a shift in promotion policy to reward distinguished Civil War veterans with higher retired rank and pay. Potter was succeeded by Colonel Orlando B. Willcox, another six-month general who was succeeded on a more permanent basis by Colonel Wesley Merritt. As such lame duck generals became more common, their tenure in grade dropped from months to weeks to days, finally hitting bottom in October 1899 when a single vacant brigadier generalcy cycled through five occupants in five days, each officer in turn being promoted one day and retired the next.

The reorganization of the peacetime Army after the Spanish–American War more than doubled the number of brigadier generals of the line, allowing the administration to strike a balance between rewarding aging war heroes who would retire in months or even hours, and elevating more vigorous leaders who could lead the Army for years. By March 1906 the Army's retired list included 115 brigadier generals who had been promoted to that grade on the active list and immediately retired, plus another 101 who had been promoted on the retired list, so Congress called an end to the parade of one-day generals by requiring general officers to serve at least one year in grade before requesting retirement.

Legislative history

The following list of Congressional legislation includes all acts of Congress directly pertaining to appointments to the grade of brigadier general in the Regular Army. It does not include legislation pertaining solely to appointments to that grade in the non-permanent establishment, or by brevet.

Each entry lists an act of Congress, its citation in the United States Statutes at Large, the total number of active-duty brigadier generals authorized subsequent to the act, the subsequent number of active-duty brigadier generals of the line, the subsequent number of active-duty brigadier generals of the staff, and a summary of the act's relevance.

See also

Brigadier general (United States)
History of United States generals
List of American Civil War generals
List of United States Army four-star generals
List of lieutenant generals in the United States Army before 1960
List of major generals in the United States Regular Army before July 1, 1920

Notes

Bibliography

Biographical registers

Other publications

Army
United States Regular Army
United States Army brigadier
 
Regular Army brigadier generals before February 2, 1901